Vladik Khachatryan is the Minister of Science and Education in the Nagorno-Karabakh legislature.

References

Politicians from the Republic of Artsakh
Living people
Year of birth missing (living people)